Kareem Sow (born September 28, 2000) is a Canadian soccer player who plays as a defender for the HFX Wanderers of the Canadian Premier League.

Early life 
Sow played youth soccer with the Gloucester Hornets SC, before joining the Montreal Impact Academy at U13 level.

University career
In 2018, he attended the University of Montreal playing for the Carabins soccer team where he was named to the first all-star team of the Quebec university network (RSEQ) in 2019. He won the national championship with the Carabins in 2021, while also being named to the RSEQ First Team All-Star, U SPORTS Second Team All-Star and Canadian Championship All-Star Team.

Club career
In the 2021 CPL-U Sports Draft, he was selected tenth overall by HFX Wanderers of the Canadian Premier League. In June 2021, he signed a developmental contract with HFX Wanderers for the 2021 season, allowing him to retain his university eligibility. On August 31, HFX announced Sow was returning to the Carabins and the University of Montreal. In 2022, he signed another developmental contract with the Wanderers. In August 2022, he once again returned to his university team, per the terms of his developmental contract.

International career
In 2014, he attended a camp for the Canada U15 national team.

Career statistics

References

External links

2000 births
Living people
Association football defenders
Canadian soccer players
Soccer people from Quebec
HFX Wanderers FC players
Canadian Premier League players
HFX Wanderers FC draft picks
Université de Montréal alumni
University and college soccer players in Canada